The 2007 Ulster Senior Club Football Championship was the 2007 installment of the annual Ulster Senior Club Football Championship which is administered by Ulster GAA. The holders were Crossmaglen Rangers of Armagh. They defeated St Galls of Antrim in the final. Crossmaglen received the Séamus McFerran Cup and went on to represent Ulster in the All-Ireland Senior Club Football Championship.

Preliminary round

Quarter-finals

Semi-finals

Final

References

External links
 Ulster GAA website

Ulster Senior Club Football Championship
Gaelic
Ulster Senior Club Football Championship